= Sarada Raju =

Indian scholar, educator

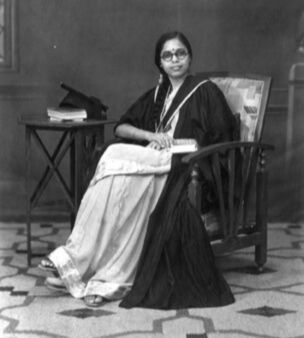
- Website: https://www.thehindu.com/features/friday-review/history-and-culture/Her-family-came-first/article12311404.ece

Sarada Raju (12 December 1912 – late 20th century) was an Indian scholar, educator, and writer, best known as the first woman to be awarded a doctorate in Economics from the University of Madras. Her research was published as the book Economic Conditions in the Madras Presidency (1800–1850).

== Awards and recognition ==
- Gold Medal in Economics: Recognized as the top student in Economics during her undergraduate studies.
- First Woman Ph.D. Holder in Economics: A historic academic milestone at the University of Madras.
- Published Works: Her book, "Economic Conditions in the Madras Presidency (1800–1850)", remains a cornerstone for research in colonial economic history.
- Presidential Address at the Indian History Congress (1976): Acclaimed for its thought leadership and eloquence.
- A detailed article was published about Dr. Sarada Raju in The Hindu newspaper
